Tambaram–Viluppuram Passenger is a passenger train of the Indian Railways, which runs between  and . It is currently being operated with 56059/56060 train numbers on a daily basis.

Average speed and frequency 

The 56059/Tambaram–Viluppuram Passenger runs with an average speed of 45 km/h and completes 134 km in 3h. The 56060/Viluppuram–Tambaram Passenger runs with an average speed of 42 km/h and completes 134 km in 3h 10m .

Route and halts 

The important halts of the train are:

 
 
 Madurantakam
 Melmaruvattur

Coach composite 

The train has standard ICF rakes with max speed of 110 kmph. The train consists of 10 coaches:

 8 General Unreserved
 2 Seating cum Luggage Rake

Traction

Both trains are hauled by an Erode Loco Shed or Royapuram Loco Shed based WAP-4 electric locomotive from Tambaram to Viluppuram and vice versa.

See also 

 Tambaram railway station
 Viluppuram Junction railway station

Notes

References

External links 

 56859/Tambaram Villupuram Passenger
 56860/Villupuram Tambaram Passenger

Transport in Chennai
Rail transport in Tamil Nadu
Slow and fast passenger trains in India